Patrik Andersson may refer to:

 Patrik Andersson (born 1971), Swedish footballer
 Patrik Andersson (footballer, born 1967), Swedish footballer

See also
 Patrick Anderson (disambiguation)